Bosley railway station served the village of Bosley, Cheshire. The station was opened by the North Staffordshire Railway in September 1849 as part of the Churnet Valley line.

The station was some distance from the village, to which it was linked by a footpath. To travel between the village and the station by road was a much longer journey. The main customer of the station was the corn mill belonging to Francis R Thompstone & Sons Ltd which was situated next to the station. The tramway opened in 1887 and closed around 1925. Remains of the track can still just be seen in a shallow cutting through woodland, leading to the old transhipment dock, just below Bosley bottom lock.

Bosley station remained open until passenger services were withdrawn from the northern end of the Churnet valley line ( – ) in 1960. Freight services lasted until 1964 when they too were withdrawn and the track lifted.

Today, the station remains as a private residence and the church near it still remains active. The trackbed has been built on by industrial buildings. The trackbed can be traced on a map to Leek and Macclesfield.

Route

References
Notes

Footnotes

Sources

Disused railway stations in Cheshire
Railway stations in Great Britain closed in 1960
Railway stations in Great Britain opened in 1849
Former North Staffordshire Railway stations
1849 establishments in England